Marion Price Daniel III (June 8, 1941 – January 19, 1981) was a United States politician from Texas who served as Speaker of the Texas House of Representatives from 1973 to 1975.

Early life
Daniel was a Texas state politician, born in Austin on June 8, 1941, into a political dynasty that dated back to his great-great-great grandparents Sam Houston and Margaret Lea Houston.  At the time of his birth, his father Marion Price Daniel Sr. was a state representative who eventually rose to the office of Governor of Texas.  Daniel Sr. also served as Speaker of the Texas House of Representatives, as United States Senator and Associate Justice of the Texas Supreme Court. His mother Jean Houston Baldwin, a member of both the Daughters of the Republic of Texas and the Daughters of the American Revolution, was a direct descendant of Sam and Margaret Lea Houston. Daniel Sr.'s brother William Partlow Daniel, also served in the Texas House of Representatives and had been appointed Governor of the U.S. Territory of Guam by President John F. Kennedy.

He was raised in Austin and followed the political career of his father. By age twelve, he was making speeches on his father's behalf. He graduated from Austin High School in 1959, Baylor University in 1964, and Baylor Law School in 1966. While still enrolled in the university, Daniel started a mail-order book business that specialized in rare books of Texas history.

Political career
After receiving his law degree, Daniel moved to Liberty, Texas, and began his legal practice there, where he was also elected Justice of the Peace for Liberty County. In 1968, at age 27, he was elected to the Texas House of Representatives from the same seat his father had held from 1939 to 1945.

After the fallout from the Sharpstown scandal, with those connected being voted out of office, there was a 50% turnover in both houses of the Texas Legislature. On January 9, 1973, Price Jr. was unanimously elected Speaker of the House by his fellow Democratic Party state representatives, who had a 133 to 17 majority over the Republican Party in the House.

Under Daniel's leadership, the reform-minded Sixty-third Texas Legislature passed new ethics, financial disclosure, and open-records laws. The Legislature also updated and strengthened open-meetings, and lobbying laws. He believed that it should be illegal for the speaker to offer favors or make threats in order to get votes. Because of the great power of the office, Daniel believed that no speaker should be elected for more than one term, and consequently he did not seek reelection in 1974.  There had been talk of Price Jr. running for Governor in 1974,  but he was apparently not interested.

Price Jr. served as president of the 1974 Texas Constitutional Convention, the first since the Constitution was established in 1876. He relented on a right-to-work compromise to appease the conservatives, and in doing so, lost his base of the liberal labor force.  The 1974 convention to revise the state constitution was not a success.  Further alienating his support base, Price Jr held a press conference blaming organized labor, and specifically what he saw as its manipulation of racial minority delegates, for the convention's failure.

In 1978, Daniel unsuccessfully sought the Democratic nomination for Texas Attorney General, losing to eventual general election winner Mark White.

Personal life and death
Daniel was married twice. He married politically connected Diane Ford Wommack on April 4, 1966.  Diane was a descendant of Texas Governor (1907–1911) Thomas Mitchell Campbell.  Diane gave birth to his son Thomas Houston Campbell Daniel. Their divorce was final November 26, 1975.

His second wife was Dairy Queen waitress Vickie Loretha Carroll Moore.  Vickie and husband Larry Dale Moore were divorced on August 16, 1976.  Price and Vickie were married November 1, 1976. Vickie gave birth to two sons by Price, Franklin Baldwin Daniel  and Marion Price Daniel, IV. One month after Price declared his candidacy for Texas Attorney General, Vickie filed for divorce on October 22, 1977, but apparently withdrew the petition.  In May 1980, Price re-wrote his will, cutting Vickie out.  December 31 of that year, Vickie once again filed for divorce, even though she and Price continued to share a house with separate quarters.  Price was served with divorce papers on January 15, 1981.  On January 19, Price returned home where he was allegedly shot and killed by Vickie.

After a 10-hour session involving 22 people, the Liberty County grand jury returned an indictment of murder against Mrs. Daniel. At the time of her indictment, she had not yet been questioned by authorities about the events leading up to her husband's death, nor had she testified before the grand jury. Vickie was represented by flamboyant legal legend Richard "Racehorse" Haynes and was acquitted on October 30, 1981.  The shooting and Vickie Daniel's murder trial were the subject of a 1987 book, Deadly Blessings and a 1992 made-for-television film, Bed of Lies.

Houston family tree
Marion Price Daniel Jr. was a direct descendant of Sam Houston and his wife Margaret Lea Houston through his mother Jean Houston Baldwin Daniel, as noted by the family tree below.

Bibliography

References

Further reading

External links
 
 
 

1941 births
1981 deaths
1981 murders in the United States
Speakers of the Texas House of Representatives
Democratic Party members of the Texas House of Representatives
Baylor University alumni
Deaths by firearm in Texas
People murdered in Texas
Male murder victims
People from Austin, Texas
People from Liberty, Texas
Sam Houston
20th-century American politicians
Candidates in the 1978 United States elections